The Bangla Congress was a regional political party in the Indian state of West Bengal. It was formed through a split in the Indian National Congress in 1966 and later co-governed with the Communist Party of India (Marxist) (CPI(M)) in two United Front governments, the first lasting from 15 March 1967 to 2 November 1967, the second from 25 February 1969 to 19 March 1970.

History

Mainly the Left Wing of the Bengal Congress, represented by Ajoy Mukherjee, Pranab Mukherjee, Siddhartha Shankar Ray, A. B. A. Ghani Khan Choudhury, Abha Maiti revolted against the leadership of the old conservative elites of "the Syndicate" like Prafulla Chandra Sen and Atulya Ghosh in 1966 owing to the policies of the Prafulla Sen government during the Food Movement.

The revolt was mainly led by younger leaders of the Congress and enjoyed widespread support among the rural landowning and trading classes as well as the middle castes of rural Bengal, such as the Mahishyas, Aguris and the Sadgops who looked upon an alliance with the Proletarian Left Front as useful against the dominance of the Calcutta-oriented Congress leadership which was seen to favour the Calcutta-based large private industries and British business interests too much.

The Party had a strong base in Midnapore, Hooghly, Nadia, Murshidabad and all of North Bengal and a big plank was development of rural areas and small towns as opposed to the Calcutta-obsessed approach of the Congress-led West Bengal Government.

Ajoy Mukherjee, a veteran Congress leader from Tamluk, a rural area of Midnapore was the Chief Minister in both governments formed by the Coalition and till date, he remains the only Chief Minister of West Bengal not to reside in a Calcutta postal address. Other later Congress leaders like Priya Ranjan DasMunshi, Manas Bhunia and Somen Mitra also started their careers as lower rung student leaders of the Bangla Congress split.

On 19 March 1970 the second United Front government fell as a result of the breakdown of the alliance between the Bangla Congress and the Communist Party of India (Marxist). Thanks to the Land Reform movement led by Communist leaders Benoy Choudhury and Hare Krishna Konar which threatened the interests of the landowning Middle/backward castes that supported the Bangla Congress.

The Bangla Congress then went into rapid decline and was later reunified with the Indian National Congress.

Electoral results

West Bengal state assembly

1967: 80 candidates, 34 elected, 1,286,028 votes

1969: 49 candidates, 33 elected, 1,094,654 votes

1971: 137 candidates, 5 elected, 695,376 votes

Lok Sabha election

1967: 7 candidates, 5 elected, 1,204,356 votes

1971: 14 candidates, 1 elected, 518,781 votes

See also
 Indian National Congress breakaway parties

References

External links
 Split in a Predominant Party: The Indian National Congress in 1969

Defunct political parties in West Bengal
Indian National Congress breakaway groups
Political parties established in 1966
Political parties disestablished in 1971
1966 establishments in West Bengal
1971 disestablishments in India